Gostin may refer to:
 3640 Gostin, a main-belt asteroid, named after Victor Gostin
 Larry Gostin, an American law professor
 Victor Gostin (born 1940), an Australian geologist